Las Ventas de Santa Lucía is a hamlet located in the municipality of Graus, in Huesca province, Aragon, Spain. As of 2020, it has a population of 28.

Geography 
Las Ventas de Santa Lucía is located 91km east of Huesca.

References

Populated places in the Province of Huesca